Amalanhig (also called 'Maranhig' or 'Amaranhig') are creatures in Visayan mythology, particularly among Hiligaynon speaking groups. Amalanhig are Aswangs who failed to transfer their monstrosity causing them to rise from their graves to kill humans by biting their necks. Another version that has survived through word-of-mouth recounts that Amanlanhigs are said to chase any living person they found and once they reach them, they would tickle the victim until they die, both of laughter and terror. In order to escape from Amanlanhigs, one runs in zigzag direction since they can only walk in straight direction due to the stiffness of their body. One would also climb trees or high platforms enough to be out of their reach. One would also run into lakes and rivers since Amanlanhigs are scared of deep bodies of water.

The Amalanhig are depicted as externally identical to humans, though there is an enlargement of the upper canines in most individuals. The Amalanhig is a variant of the vampire native to the Philippines.

References

Visayan mythology
Philippine demons